Camp Dread is a 2014 American horror film written and directed by Harrison Smith and starring Eric Roberts and Danielle Harris.

Cast
Eric Roberts as Julian Barrett
Danielle Harris as Sheriff Donlyn Eldridge
Felissa Rose as Rachel Steele
Joe Raffa as Novak

Release
The film was released on DVD on April 15, 2014.

References

External links
 
 

American horror films
2014 horror films
2010s English-language films
2010s American films